The Federal Supreme Court of Switzerland is the supreme court of the Swiss Confederation and at the head of the Swiss judiciary.

The Federal Supreme Court is headquartered in the Federal Courthouse in Lausanne in the canton of Vaud. The two social security divisions of the Federal Supreme Court (formerly Federal Insurance Court, as an organizationally independent unit of the Federal Supreme Court), are located in Lucerne. The Federal Assembly elects 38 justices to the Federal Supreme Court. The current president of the court is Martha Niquille.

Functions 
The Federal Supreme Court is the final arbiter on disputes in the field of civil law (citizens-citizens), the public arena (citizen-state), as well as in disputes between cantons or between cantons and the Confederation. The Supreme Court's decisions in the field of human rights violations can be appealed to the European Court of Human Rights in Strasbourg.

As a state agency, the Federal Supreme Court examines the uniform application of federal law by the cantonal and federal courts of lower instance. It protects the rights that citizens have under the Federal Constitution. In the proceedings, the Federal Supreme Court examines the application of the law but does not examine the facts established by the lower courts, unless they are manifestly arbitrary.

When an appeal is filed, the Federal Supreme Court examines whether the law was correctly applied in the contested decision and thus ensures the uniform application of federal law throughout the country. Its decisions contribute to the development of the law and to its adaptation to new circumstances. The other courts and the administrative authorities use the decisions of the Federal Supreme Court as a reference and adopt their principles. Procedures before the Federal Supreme Court take place in writing. There are no court hearings with plaintiffs and defendants giving testimony and lawyers pleading their cases. The Federal Supreme Court bases its decisions on facts as they are established by the lower instances and described in the records of the previous proceedings. If the Federal Supreme Court concludes that a lower court has decided incorrectly, it overturns the contested decision and if necessary sends it back to the previous instance for a new decision. In addition to its work as the highest judicial authority, the Federal Supreme Court exercises administrative supervision over the Federal Criminal Court, the Federal Administrative Court and the Federal Patent Court.

According to the Constitution of Switzerland, the court has jurisdiction over violations of:
federal law;
public international law;
inter-cantonal law;
cantonal constitutional rights;
autonomy of municipalities, and other guarantees granted by the cantons to public corporate bodies; and 
federal and cantonal provisions concerning political rights.

Because of an emphasis on direct democracy through referendum, the Constitution precludes the Federal Supreme Court from reviewing acts of the Federal Parliament, unless such review is specifically provided for by statute.

Decisions of arbitral tribunals constituted under Swiss law, such as the Court of Arbitration for Sport, can be appealed to the Federal Supreme Court, although judicial review is limited to a very narrow set of questions of law in such cases.

Organisation 

The supervisory bodies are the Court Assembly, the Administrative Commission and the Conference of Presidents. The Court Assembly consists of all ordinary justices and is mainly responsible for the Court's internal organisation. It designates the divisions, appoints their presidents and issues the procedural rules for the Court. The Administrative Commission is responsible for managing the Court's administration. It is composed of the President of the Federal Supreme Court, the Vice-President and one other justice. The Conference of Presidents consists of the presidents of the various divisions and is responsible for the coordination of judicial decision-making among the divisions. The President of the Federal Supreme Court acts in an advisory capacity. The Secretary-General participates in meetings held by the Court Assembly, the Administrative Commission  and the Conference of Presidents in an advisory capacity.  The first woman to be elected into the Federal Supreme Court was Margrith Bigler-Eggenberger in 1972 one year after women were permitted to participate in elections on a federal level.

Federal justices 

A total of 38 justices sit on the bench of the Federal Supreme Court. Currently 14 women and 24 men serve as federal justices. Of the federal justices currently serving on the bench, three have Italian, 12 French and 23 German as their native language. The justices are forbidden from engaging in any gainful occupation outside of their work as federal justices. The federal justices have the status of government officials.

The federal justices are proposed by the Judicial Committee and elected by the United Federal Assembly (National Council and Council of States) for a term of office of six years. They can be re-elected an unlimited number of times. There is, however, an upper age limit of 68. Anyone who has the right to vote at the federal level may be elected a federal justice; the law does not prescribe any legal training. In practice, however, only proven jurists from the judiciary, practicing legal profession, academia or the public sector are elected.

Deputy federal justices 

The Federal Supreme Court numbers 19 deputy justices, who are also elected by the Federal Assembly. Of the deputy justices currently sitting on the bench, three have Italian, five French and 11 German as their native language. Nine of the deputy justices are women. The deputy federal justices serve in a part-time capacity, otherwise they are professors, practicing lawyers or cantonal judges. As a general rule, they serve as replacements for justices who have recused themselves or have taken ill, or when the Court's docket has become overly full. In the proceedings on which they sit they have the same rights and obligations as the ordinary federal justices.

Court clerks 

The court clerks are the judicial staff of the justices. Previously their primary task was to draft the written judgements after the decisions had been rendered in court. Due to  the increasing case load of the Court, the court clerks are now also tasked with drafting the draft ruling in many cases. They also are involved in an advisory capacity in the preparatory stages of proceedings and during deliberations. They draft the final text of rulings based on the remarks made by the members of the division. Currently 132 court clerks serve on the Federal Supreme Court, approximately one third of whom are women.

Divisions 
The 38 federal justices are elected by the United Federal Assembly. The Federal Supreme Court is composed of seven divisions, with five or six justices each. The tasks of the divisions differ according to the legal domains they cover (public law, private law, criminal law).

First Public Law Division
Guarantee of ownership, national and regional spatial planning and construction law, environmental protection, political rights, international judicial cooperation in criminal matters, road traffic (including the revocation of driving licences), citizenship, guarantees of due process. In criminal proceedings: appeals against interlocutory rulings.Division president:  Lorenz Kneubühler,Judges: Monique Jametti, Stephan Haag, Thomas Müller, Laurent Merz, François Chaix 

Second Public Law Division
Rights of foreigners, taxes and duties, public commercial law (e.g. state liability, subsidies, radio and television), fundamental rights such as freedom of religion and conscience, freedom of language and economic freedom.Division president: Florence Aubry GirardinJudges: Yves Donzallaz,  Stephan Hartmann, Marianne Ryter, Julia Hänni, Michael Beusch

First Civil Law Division
Code of Obligations (law of obligations), insurance contracts, intellectual property rights, competition law and international arbitration.Division president: Fabienne HohlJudges: Martha Niquille, Christina Kiss, Yves Rüedi, Marie-Chantal May Canellas

Second Civil Law Division
Civil Code (law of persons, family law, law of succession and property law), proceedings concerning debt recovery and bankruptcy.Division president: Christian HerrmannJudges: Elisabeth Escher, Luca Marazzi, Nicolas von Werdt, Felix Schöbi, Grégory Bovey

Criminal Law Division
Criminal matters arising from substantive criminal law (including the execution of penalties and measures) and from the Code of Criminal Procedure (except appeals against interlocutory rulings in criminal proceedings).Division president: Christian DenysJudges: Laura Jacquemoud-Rossari, Giuseppe Muschietti, Beatrice van de Graaf, Sonja Koch

First Social Law Division
Disability insurance, accident insurance, unemployment insurance, cantonal social insurance, family allowances, social assistance, military insurance and civil service law.Division president: Martin Wirthlin (Präsident), Judges: Alexia Heine, Daniela Viscione, Bernard Abrecht, Marcel Maillard

Second Social Law Division
Old-age and survivors’ insurance, disability insurance, loss-of-income payments, supplementary benefits, health insurance and occupational pensions.Division president: Francesco ParrinoJudges: Thomas Stadelmann, Lucrezia Glanzmann, Margit Moser-Szeless

See also 
 Federal courts of Switzerland
 Federal Criminal Court of Switzerland
 Federal Administrative Court
 Federal Patent Court

Notes and references

External links 

  
 Page on the website of the City of Lausanne

Supreme Court
Switzerland
Buildings and structures in Lausanne
Neoclassical architecture in Switzerland
1849 establishments in Switzerland
Courts and tribunals established in 1849